Praise the Lard is an album by PIG (Raymond Watts), initially released on Concrete Productions in 1991 and re-released by Cleopatra Records in 1997.

The re-released version has an incorrect track listing, due to the use of artwork from the original LP version. Cleopatra Records reissued the album after "purchasing" the rights from someone who did not legally own them. Raymond has indicated his desire to re-release the album, possibly with bonus tracks, but the album is currently unavailable in all markets (as of 2017).

Track listing 
"My Sanctuary" (Raymond Watts) – 5:49
"Gravy Train" (Watts) – 3:46
"Angel" (Watts) – 4:04
"Valley of the Ignorant" (Watts) – 3:38
"A Touch of Upheaval" (Watts) – 3:35
"Infinite Shame" (Watts) – 4:07
"Hog Love" (Watts, Anna Wildsmith) – 3:55
"Sweet Child" (Watts) – 5:51
"Sweat and Sour" (Watts) – 1:43
"Blood Slicked Highway" (Watts) – 5:16
"¡Toxico!" (Watts) – 5:11
"Sick City" (Watts) – 5:08

Personnel 
Raymond Watts
Mike Watts – organ on track 3
JG Thirlwell on track 12

References 

Pig (musical project) albums
1991 albums
Albums produced by JG Thirlwell
Cleopatra Records albums